AAIB may refer to:

Aircraft accident investigation organizations
 Air Accident Investigation Bureau (Malaysia), an agency of the Ministry of Transport (Malaysia)
 Air Accident Investigation Bureau (Mongolia), a branch of the government of Mongolia
 Air Accident Investigation Bureau of Singapore, a statutory board of the Ministry of Transport in Singapore
 Air Accidents Investigation Branch, a branch of the Department for Transport in the United Kingdom
 Aircraft Accident Investigation Board (Iceland), a branch of the government of Iceland
 Aircraft Accident Investigation Bureau (India), a branch of the government of India
 Aircraft Accident Investigation Bureau (Switzerland), a former branch of the government of Switzerland

Other meanings
 African Alliance Investment Bank

See also 
 Aircraft Accident Investigation Bureau (disambiguation)
 Accident Investigation Bureau (disambiguation)
 AIB
 AAIIB